The 2017–18 East Carolina Pirates men's basketball team represented East Carolina University during the 2017–18 NCAA Division I men's basketball season. The Pirates were led by interim head coach Michael Perry and played their home games at Williams Arena at Minges Coliseum as fourth-year members of the American Athletic Conference. They finished the season 10–20, 4–14 in AAC play to finish in 11th place. They lost in the first round of the AAC tournament to UCF.

Following a 2–4 start to the season, eighth-year head coach Jeff Lebo announced his resignation from ECU on November 29, 2017 and Perry was named interim head coach. On April 4, 2018 the school announced that Florida Gulf Coast head coach Joe Dooley, who coached the Pirates from 1995 to 1999, would return as head coach.

Previous season
The Pirates finished the 2016–17 season 15–18, 6–12 in AAC play to finish in ninth place. They defeated Temple in the first round of the AAC tournament to advance to the quarterfinals where they lost to SMU.

On January 16, 2017, head coach Jeff Lebo underwent hip surgery and was unable to coach for the rest of the season. Assistant coach Michael Perry took over as acting head coach beginning with the January 22 game.

Offseason

Departures

Incoming transfers

Recruiting class of 2017

Recruiting class of 2018

Roster

Schedule and results

|-
!colspan=9 style=| Non-conference regular season

|-
!colspan=9 style=| AAC regular season

|-
!colspan=9 style=|AAC tournament

References

East Carolina Pirates men's basketball seasons
East Carolina
2018 in sports in North Carolina
2017 in sports in North Carolina